Channel 4 F1, commonly abbreviated to C4F1, is a British television programme dedicated to the coverage of Formula One motor racing and has been aired by the British broadcaster Channel 4 since 2016. Prior to 2019, half of the season's practice, qualifying sessions and races were shown live, with all other events covered in an extended qualifying and race highlights format.

From 2019 to 2023, only the British GP race will be shown live along with highlights of all other races. 

F1 coverage is shown on the main channel, on-demand service All 4 and the More4 channel in occasional circumstances.

History

2016–2018
On 21 December 2015, the BBC announced that it would end its deal with Formula One three years early due to budget cuts and would transfer the remaining three years to Channel 4. Channel 4 would be showing ten selected races live without advertisements and every race (even live) was to be shown as highlights. Channel 4 was the first free-to-air commercial station that ran without commercial breaks during its ten live races.

Channel 4 also showed the race and associated events of the British Grand Prix and final race weekend. Extended highlights were shown of all remaining races a few hours after they finish, early evening for European and Asian which are shown live races, afternoon for Asian races or late night for live races and ones in the Americas. Qualifying highlights for live races were only shown if they were live races in Asia. Live race coverage was produced by Whisper Films, with North One Television to produce accompanying programmes. Channel 4's full presenting team was announced on 8 March 2016.

Channel 4 also announced that "The Chain" by Fleetwood Mac would be their title music, the song previously used by the BBC's coverage.

Frequent references to social media were made in the programme's break bumpers, usually in the form of hashtags in response to events as they unfold, driver/fan tweets, or simply the appearance of the #C4F1 hashtag.

For the first two years of Channel 4's coverage, the sponsor was travel site Kayak.com. They were replaced for the 2018 season by audio company Bose.

For Practice Two of the 2016 European Grand Prix and 2016 Mexican Grand Prix, More4 had the coverage due to Channel 4 covering the Royal Ascot horse race.

For Practice One and Two of the 2017 United States Grand Prix and 2018 United States Grand Prix, More4 also had the coverage.

2019 onwards
Beginning 2019, Sky Sports hold exclusive rights to all races excluding the British Grand Prix. In September 2018, it was announced that Channel 4 had agreed to a sub-licensing agreement with Sky, under which it broadcasts free-to-air highlights of all races, and live coverage of the British Grand Prix. As part of the arrangement, Sky will have rights to carry full series of Channel 4 dramas on-demand, while Channel 4 also acquired free-to-air rights to the Sky drama Tin Star.

They continued to be sponsored by Bose.

On 13 March 2019, three days before the first Grand Prix of the season, it was revealed that Channel 4 will not be permitted (under their agreement with Sky) to interview drivers in the "pen", hold interviews in the pit lane or hold a grid walk, these restrictions do not apply for the British Grand Prix. Furthermore, Channel 4 must adhere to these and other restrictions in order for Sky to consider agreeing to the same arrangements in 2020.

For the 2020 season due to the COVID-19 pandemic, programmes for races 1-3 were presented from The Silverstone Experience as F1 limited the number of broadcasters on site. Clarkson, who works primarily for F1 TV served as Channel 4's paddock reporter, when they were unable to access the paddock. It also saw the introduction of a touch screen. During coverage of the Hungarian Grand Prix, it was confirmed that they would have access to the paddock for at least the British and 70th Anniversary weekends. However, despite being held at Silverstone Circuit Channel 4  were  not allowed to broadcast the 70th Anniversary race live as they are only permitted by their agreement with Sky Sports to broadcast the race named British Grand Prix as was hinted at in an F1 Q+A before the 2020 season started.

The 2020 Spanish Grand Prix was presented from the McLaren Technology Centre in Woking. It was confirmed during coverage that Channel 4 F1 would be present in the paddock for the next race, the Belgian Grand Prix at Spa-Francorchamps. The Russian Grand Prix was presented off-site from Red Bull's HQ in Milton Keynes but they returned to the paddock for the Eifel Grand Prix. The Russian Grand Prix was again presented off-site from Red Bull's HQ in Milton Keynes in 2021.

Coverage of the 2020 and 2021 seasons is sponsored by Bristol Street Motors and Macklin Motors. It was announced at the Turkish Grand Prix that Edwards would step down following the Abu Dhabi Grand Prix, his replacement was announced a week later as Alex Jacques who joins from F1's official television channel, including for F2, F3 and Esports. He has also worked for BBC Radio 5 Live in a similar role at the occasional race. Also it was later announced that 'pen interviews' would be taken from F1TV with Lawrence Barretto joining the team as paddock reporter.

Steve Jones was absent from the 2021 Azerbaijan Grand Prix after he was unable to receive a PCR result prior to travelling. The Azerbaijan coverage was presented by Lee McKenzie with Mark Webber, Billy Monger and Alex Jacques. Jones and Alex Jacques were absent from the 2021 Styrian Grand Prix after Billy Monger tested positive for COVID-19, therefore the coverage was presented by David Coulthard and Mark Webber with Ben Edwards briefly returning as lead commentator commentating remotely from the UK. For the 2021 Russian Grand Prix Channel 4 broadcast again off-site from Red Bull Racing HQ.

Lee McKenzie presented the 2021 United States Grand Prix coverage with Alex Jacques and Billy Monger on commentary. For the 2021 Mexico City Grand Prix the lineup consisted of Alex Jacques and Billy Monger on commentary with David Coulthard and Lawrence Barretto on site.

Channel 4 reached a one off agreement with Sky Sports F1 and Formula One Management to show the live coverage of the 2021 Abu Dhabi Grand Prix which decided the 2021 drivers' title between Lewis Hamilton and Max Verstappen. Channel 4 did not use its own commentators for the race, instead taking the Sky Sports F1 commentary provided by David Croft and Martin Brundle.

For the 2022 season, F1 on Channel 4 continues to be sponsored by Bristol Street Motors.

In October 2022 it was confirmed Channel 4 would continue with highlights and live coverage of Silverstone in 2023. For the 2022 Japanese Grand Prix, coverage was presented by Jones, Barretto and Felipe Massa on site, with Coulthard, Monger and Jacques commentating remotely. 

For the 2022 United States Grand Prix and 2022 Mexico City Grand Prix, coverage was presented by Lee McKenzie and David Coulthard on site with Alex Jacques and Billy Monger on commentary. For the 2022 São Paulo Grand Prix, coverage was presented off-site from Red Bull Racing HQ.

Online
Channel 4's website had reports and analysis from David Coulthard and Ben Edwards. As of 2021 it no longer exists and re-directs to All 4.

Broadcast team
Appearances are confirmed as the season goes on, all announced dates are listed.

Former broadcast team
 Ben Edwards, Lead Commentator, 2016–20, 2021 Styrian Grand Prix and 2021 Austrian Grand Prix (qualifying only). Joined F1TV Live for selected 2022 races.
 Louise Goodman, Relief Presenter/Interviewer, 2016–18
 Susie Wolff, Analyst, 2016–18
 Alain Prost, Analyst, 2016–17
 Holly Samos, Relief Presenter/Interviewer 2016–17
 Karun Chandhok, Analyst/Technical Analyst, Co-Commentator and Paddock Reporter, 2016–18. Rejoined Sky Sports F1
 Stefano Domenicali, Analyst, 2019. joined Formula One as CEO 
 Murray Walker, Interviewer, Analyst and Commentator, 2016–20. died during 2021 pre-season testing

Producers/editors
 Sunil Patel (Executive Producer) – Previously worked for BBC F1
 John Curtis (Editor) – Previously worked for Sky Sports News
 Steve Aldous (Assistant Editor) – Previously Worked for ITV and BBC F1
 Tony Dodgins (Commentary Producer) – Previously worked for BBC F1
 Tim Hampel (Producer)
 Richard Gort (Creative Director)
 Kate Waller (Archive Producer)
 Deborah Creaven (Production Manager)
 Allan Handley (Production Accountant)
 Jamie McIntosh (Production Coordinator)
 Dax Wood (Digital Producer)
 Elli Hall (Researcher / PA)
 Sarah Holt (digital editor) – Freelancer who used to work for BBC F1 online
 JR Catipon (Researcher)

References

Formula One mass media
Channel 4 original programming
2016 British television series debuts
2010s British sports television series
2020s British sports television series
English-language television shows